D.E.V.O.L.U.T.I.O.N. is the tenth studio album by German thrash metal band Destruction. The album was released on 29 August 2008 by AFM Records worldwide and Candlelight Records in the United States.

The album features three guitarists as guest appearances — Gary Holt of Exodus and Slayer and Jeff Waters of Annihilator, both playing solos in the song "Urge (The Greed of Gain)", in addition to Vinnie Moore from UFO.

All the first letters of each track on the record spell out the word "devolution".

Track listing

Personnel 
Writing, performance and production credits are adapted from the album liner notes.

Destruction
 Schmier – bass, vocals
 Mike Sifringer – guitars
 Marc Reign – drums

Guest musicians
 Vinnie Moore – guitar solo on "D.evolution"
 Harry Wilkens – guitar solo on "E.levator to Hell"
 V.O. Pulver – guitar solo on "E.levator to Hell"
 Jacob Hansen – guitar solo on "L.ast Desperate Scream", "O.dyssey of Frustration"
 Gary Holt – guitar solo on "U.rge (The Greed of Gain)"
 Jeff Waters – guitar solo on "U.rge (The Greed of Gain)"
 Flemming C. Lund (ex-Invocator) – guitar solo on "O.dyssey of Frustration"

Additional musicians
 Asbjörn Steffensen – backing vocals
 Jeppe S. Nielsen – backing vocals
 Torsten Madsen – backing vocals
 Kasper Kierkegaard – backing vocals
 Jan B. Jepsen – backing vocals
 Jacob Hansen – backing vocals
 Jeppe Andersson – backing vocals

Production
 Destruction – production
 Jacob Hansen – production, mixing, mastering
 Jeppe Andersson – assisting engineering
 Martin Pagaard – drum tech

Artwork and design
 Gyula Havancsák – Cover art
 Katja Piolka – photography (Schirmer only)

References 

2008 albums
Destruction (band) albums
AFM Records albums